Blastobasis incuriosa is a moth of the family Blastobasidae. It is found in Australia.

External links
Australian Faunal Directory

Moths of Australia
Blastobasis
Moths described in 1916